Valentine McCallum (born 10 October 1963) is an American guitarist and singer-songwriter.

Career
McCallum has toured with, and served as a studio musician for many well-known musicians. He toured with Jackson Browne, and McCallum's musical resume includes stints with Sheryl Crow, Lucinda Williams, The Wallflowers, Bonnie Raitt, and Loretta Lynn, among others. McCallum released his first solo record, entitled At the End of the Day.  His parents are actor/musician David McCallum and actress Jill Ireland.

In addition to his solo album and extensive work in touring and session bands, McCallum is also a member of the comic-country band, Jackshit. The band originated as Vonda Shepard's backing band on the hit series Ally McBeal.

References

External links

 
Val McCallum Interview NAMM Oral History Library (2021)

Living people
1963 births
American people of English descent
American people of Scottish descent
American singer-songwriters
American male singer-songwriters
20th-century American singers
20th-century American male singers
20th-century American guitarists
21st-century American singers
21st-century American male singers
21st-century American guitarists
American male guitarists